Pierre Louis Rouillard (Paris, 16 January 1820 – Paris, 2 June 1881) was a French sculptor known for his sculptures of animals. He was one of a "school of French animalières", which also included Pierre-Jules Mêne, Antoine-Louis Barye, Auguste Caïn and François Pompon. He worked mainly in cast iron rather than bronze.

Rouillard attended the École des Beaux-Arts in Paris, where he was a pupil of Jean-Pierre Cortot. He was a professor of sculpture at the École des Arts décoratifs from 1840 to 1881. François Pompon studied with him.

His works include sculptures for the Opéra de Paris, Palais du Louvre and the Fontaine Saint-Michel.
He was commissioned to travel to Istanbul, by Sultan Abdulaziz. He has many sculptures in different locations of Istanbul, including a bull sculpture at the center of Istanbul's Kadıköy district.
He was awarded the Ordre des Palmes Académiques and made a Chevalier of the Légion d'honneur. He is buried at Issy.

Works

Gallery of images

References

External links

Pierre Louis Rouillard (1820–1881) sculpteur animalier, professeur de sculpture et d'anatomie (French)
 

1820 births
1881 deaths
Chevaliers of the Légion d'honneur
École des Beaux-Arts alumni
19th-century French sculptors
French male sculptors
19th-century French male artists